The 2018–19 EuroCup Basketball season, also known as 7DAYS EuroCup for sponsorship reasons, is the 17th season of Euroleague Basketball's secondary level professional club basketball tournament. It is the 11th season since it was renamed from the ULEB Cup to the EuroCup, and the third season under the title sponsorship name of 7DAYS.

Team allocation
A total of 24 teams participate in the 2018–19 EuroCup Basketball.

Distribution
The table below shows the default access list.

Teams
The labels in the parentheses show how each team qualified for the place of its starting round:
1st, 2nd, 3rd, etc.: League position after Playoffs
WC: Wild card

Notes

Round and draw dates
The schedule of the competition is as follows.

Draw
The draw was held on 5 July 2018 at the Mediapro Auditorium in Barcelona.

The 24 teams were drawn into four groups of six, with the restriction that teams from the same country could not be drawn against each other. For this purpose, Adriatic League worked as only one country. For the draw, the teams were seeded into six pots, in accordance with the Club Ranking, based on their performance in European competitions during a three-year period and the lowest possible position that any club from that league can occupy in the draw is calculated by adding the results of the worst performing team from each league.

Notes

 Indicates teams with points applying the minimum for the league they play.

The fixtures were decided after the draw, using a computer draw not shown to public, with the following match sequence:

Note: Positions for scheduling do not use the seeding pots, e.g., Team 1 is not necessarily the team from Pot 1 in the draw.

There were scheduling restrictions: for example, teams from the same city in general are not scheduled to play at home on the same round (to avoid them playing at home on the same day or on consecutive days, due to logistics and crowd control).

Regular season

In each group, teams played against each other home-and-away in a round-robin format. The group winners, runners-up, third-placed teams and fourth-placed teams advanced to the Top 16, while the fifth-placed teams and sixth-placed teams were eliminated. The rounds were 2–3 October, 9–10 October, 16–17 October, 23–24 October, 30–31 October, 6–7 November, 13–14 November, 20–21 November, 11–12 December, and 18–19 December 2018.

Group A

Group B

Group C

Group D

Top 16
In each group, teams played against each other home-and-away in a round-robin format. The group winners and runners-up advanced to the Playoffs, while the third-placed teams and fourth-placed teams were eliminated. The rounds were 2–3 January, 8–9 January, 15–16 January, 22–23 January, 29–30 January, and 5–6 February 2019.

Group E

Group F

Group G

Group H

Playoffs

In the playoffs, teams play against each other must win two games to win the series. Thus, if one team wins two games before all three games have been played, the game that remains is omitted. The team that finished in the higher Top 16 place will play the first and the third (if it is necessary) legs of the series at home. The playoffs involves the eight teams which qualified as winners and runners-up of each of the four groups in the Top 16.

Bracket

Quarterfinals

Semifinals

Finals

Attendances

Awards

7DAYS EuroCup MVP

7DAYS EuroCup Finals MVP

All–7DAYS EuroCup Teams

Coach of the Year

Rising Star

Regular Season MVP

Top 16 MVP

Quarterfinals MVP

Semifinals MVP

MVP of the Round
Regular Season

Top 16

Quarterfinals

Semifinals

Finals

See also
2018–19 EuroLeague
2018–19 Basketball Champions League
2018–19 FIBA Europe Cup

References

External links
Official website

 
EuroCup Basketball seasons